Lindrick Golf Club is a golf course in South Yorkshire and is also a site of special scientific interest (SSSI). The site was notified in 1987.

The course is affiliated to the Yorkshire Golf Union and, contrary to local folklore, the entire course and clubhouse is situated in Yorkshire.

Founded in 1891, the course was originally nine holes, but was extended to 18 holes in 1894. Prior to the enhancements programme started in 2015, the last major changes to the course layout occurred in 1932, to avoid two holes being played over the A57. The course design has been influenced by a variety of renown architects from 'old' Tom Morris, Willie Park (jnr), Alistair McKenzie, Fowler & Simpson, Donald Steel, Cameron Sinclair  to current award winning designer Ken Moodie.

Currently Holes 1–11 and Hole 18 are situated on the south side of the A57, with Holes 12–17 being on the north side. The course now has two tunnels providing safe crossing of the A57. The closing 18th hole features as one of the 500 Greatest Holes in the World and is also listed as one of Peter Alliss' favourite 18 holes of all time. The course plays host to a number of leading amateur tournaments, and is a venue for Regional Qualifying for The Open Championship, and is regularly featured in the various top 100 course ratings in the golfing media. Lindrick is also one of the courses (with Ganton and Moortown) who play host to the annual Yorkshire Challenge which is now one of the biggest tournaments for club golfers in the country. Lindrick also holds the annual Danny Willett Salver for the Lindrick Open Amateur Championship. 

The 1957 Ryder Cup was played at Lindrick, resulting in the only post-war victory for Great Britain & Ireland, captained by Dai Rees and in 2016 featured on Sky TV as being the only club to ever have 3 current playing members to represent Europe in that year's Ryder Cup team. The Curtis Cup was played on the course in 1960, and the Women's British Open has been held at the course on two occasions – in 1977 and 1988, and most recently the English Women's Amateur Championship in 2017.
 
The English Men's Amateur Championship will be held at Lindrick in late July 2022.

Marian Rae, the former President of England Golf, is a member.

Full PGA tour players Danny Willett, Matt Fitzpatrick, Lee Westwood, Mark Foster and Jonathan Thomson are subscribing members as well as a host of Yorkshire and England junior players.

In recent years the club have invested heavily in creating custom designed practice areas, new changing facilities as well as a full facelift to the Ryder Cup casual bar area which displays memorabilia of the Ryder Cup and Lindrick's continued association with that tournament since 1957. In 2015 they started a programme to enhance the course with new championship tees, added fairway bunkering and the rejuvenation of all other bunkers on the course with a completion date for the new course of 2020. Expenditure, from members' funds, on all the above projects is thought to be in excess of £2 million.

See also
List of Sites of Special Scientific Interest in South Yorkshire

References

External links

Golf clubs and courses in Yorkshire
Ryder Cup venues
Curtis Cup venues
Sites of Special Scientific Interest notified in 1987
Sites of Special Scientific Interest in South Yorkshire
Sports venues in South Yorkshire